Khalid bin Salman Al Saud ( Khālid bin Salmān Āl Suʿūd; born 1988) is a Saudi royal, diplomat, and politician who serves as the Saudi Arabian minister of defense. He was appointed defense minister on 27 September 2022. He is the tenth child and ninth son of King Salman.

Early life and education
Khalid bin Salman was born in 1988. He is the son of King Salman and his third spouse, Fahda bint Falah Al Hithlain.

Prince Khalid earned a bachelor's degree in aviation sciences from King Faisal Air Academy, and continued his education in the United States. He obtained a certificate from Harvard University in their senior executives in the national and international security program. He also studied advanced electronic warfare in Paris, France. Prince Khalid was enrolled in Georgetown University to pursue his higher education in the university's master of arts in security studies program. Due to various official duties and tasks, his studies were postponed prior to his appointment as ambassador to the United States.

Military career
After graduating from the King Faisal Air Academy, Prince Khalid joined the Royal Saudi Air Force. He commenced his aviation career by flying T-6 Texan and T-38 aircraft at Columbus Air Force Base in Mississippi. He then started flying F-15 S and was also appointed as a Tactical Intelligence Officer in addition to his duties as an F-15 S pilot with the 92nd Squadron of the RSAF 3rd Wing at King Abdulaziz Air Base in Dhahran.

Prince Khalid has accumulated nearly 1,000 flying hours and carried out air missions against the Salafi jihadist militant group Islamic State of Iraq and the Levant within the International Coalition's efforts. He also participated in Operation Decisive Storm and Operation Restoring Hope by flying missions over Yemen. Prince Khalid was awarded  medals including: South Shield Medal, the Battle Medal, the Excellence Medal, and the Abdullah's Sword Medal.

Prince Khalid trained extensively with the American Armed Forces both in the United States and in Saudi Arabia, including his training at Nellis Air Force Base in Nevada. A back injury prohibited Prince Khalid from flying, and he worked as an officer at the office of the Minister of Defense.

Upon completion of his military career, he was appointed as a senior civilian advisor at the Ministry of Defense. By late 2016, Prince Khalid moved to the United States where he worked as an advisor at the Royal Embassy of Saudi Arabia in Washington. In April, 2017 Prince Khalid became the tenth Saudi Ambassador to the United States since 1945.

Diplomatic career

Following his appointment as ambassador to the United States in April 2017, Prince Khalid focused on strengthening Saudi–U.S. bilateral relations.

In August and September 2017, Prince Khalid undertook his first multi-state tour of the United States, visiting Nellis Air Force Base in Nevada, Silicon Valley, Dallas, Houston, and St. Louis to underline his commitment to reaching out beyond the beltway and strengthening the Saudi–U.S. relationship in all areas.

In March 2018, Prince Khalid appeared on CNN in discussion with Wolf Blitzer to preview Crown Prince Mohammed bin Salman's trip to the United States. In the interview, he asserted: "We will continue to work with our allies in the United States and in the world to increase our economic cooperation, to increase our security cooperation and to serve our mutual interests and face our mutual threats."

Prince Khalid authored a column in the Washington Post, published on 19 March 2018, that outlined the ways in which the Kingdom of Saudi Arabia was embracing change, and how the Saudi–U.S. relationship could be strengthened as a result of this transformation.

As part of the seven-city tour around the United States, Prince Khalid joined Crown Prince Mohammed bin Salman to meet with a number of American political, economic and social leaders in Washington, Boston, New York, Seattle, Los Angeles, San Francisco and Houston. Prince Khalid attended meetings with President Donald Trump, members of the administration and congressional leaders on both sides of the aisle.

Prince Khalid participated in meetings with former leaders – including President George H. W. Bush, President Bill Clinton, Secretary of State John Kerry and Secretary of Defense Leon Panetta, along with current representatives of the five permanent members of the United Nations Security Council, including U.S. Ambassador Nikki Haley.

On the economic side, Prince Khalid joined the crown prince in meeting with entertainment and development leaders, discussing potential collaboration with executives from Warner Bros., Disney and Magic Leap. The Ambassador also joined a tour of Apple headquarters in Silicon Valley, exploring different avenues of cooperation between both sides. Prince Khalid is very close to his elder brother Mohammed and is also cited as a potential heir to him, when the latter becomes King.

Jamal Khashoggi

Jamal Khashoggi, a journalist, visited the Saudi Arabian consulate in Istanbul on Tuesday, 2 October 2018, and was murdered within minutes. The following Monday, 8 October, Khalid bin Salman denied that the Saudis had detained or killed Khashoggi.

According to a leaked CIA assessment, whose details were reported by several news outlets, including the Washington Post, Prince Khalid had instructed Khashoggi to go to the Saudi consulate in Istanbul to pick up the papers he needed, assuring him that it would be safe to do so.

Prince Khalid denied the charges.

According to Hürriyet columnist Abdulkadir Selvi, the Director of the Central Intelligence Agency Gina Haspel had possession of the "smoking gun phone call" in which crown prince Mohammad was recorded giving orders to his brother Khaled, then Saudi Arabia's ambassador to the US, "to Silence Jamal Khashoggi as Soon as Possible". The subsequent murder is the ultimate confirmation of this instruction."

In February 2019, Khalid was appointed deputy defense minister of Saudi Arabia and replaced by Reema bint Bandar Al Saud.

Ancestry

References

External links

Khalid
1988 births
Ambassadors of Saudi Arabia to the United States
Khalid
Living people
Royal Saudi Air Force personnel
Khalid
Walsh School of Foreign Service alumni
Defense ministers of Saudi Arabia